Strike! is the debut album released by The Baseballs, a German rock 'n' roll cover band, in 2009.

Their debut album Strike! was released in May 2009 in Germany, Switzerland and Austria and in October 2009 in Finland. It reached number six in Germany, number two in the Swiss and number one in the Finnish album charts. In Finland Strike! was the best-selling album of 2009 with sales of 73,626 units (triple platinum), with total sales of over 96,000 units (quadruple platinum) to date.

In April 2010, the album was re-released as Strike! Back, with a cover version of Nylon Beat's song "Last in Line" as an extra.

Track listing

Strike!

Strike! Back

CD1

CD2

Chart performance

Weekly charts
 Strike!

 Strike! Back

Year-end charts
 Strike!

 Strike! Back

Certifications
 Strike!

 Strike! Back

References

The Baseballs albums
2009 debut albums
Rockabilly albums
Covers albums
European Border Breakers Award-winning albums